Edward Tilden Career Community Academy High School (formerly known as Tilden Technical High School) is a public 4–year high school bordered between the Canaryville and Fuller Park neighborhoods on the south side of Chicago, Illinois, United States. Opened in Chicago as Lake High School in 1889, Tilden is operated by the Chicago Public Schools district.

History
The school was founded as Lake High School; located in Lake Township, Cook County, in 1881. In 1889, Lake Township was annexed to the City of Chicago, and the school became part of the Chicago Public Schools (CPS) system. Several years after being added to the district, The Chicago Board of Education decided that a new building was need for the school; approving a 7–million dollar budget for construction of the new school in 1901. The new school, located on South Union Avenue and West 47th Place, was designed by Dwight H. Perkins and constructed between March 1904 to August 1905. In 1915, the school was re–named Edward Tilden High School, honoring the recently deceased banker and former president of the Chicago Board of Education. In 1919, the school board decided that Tilden would no longer serve as a regular high school and would become an all–boys "technical" high school, forcing students who didn't want a technical education to transfer to other schools such as Lindblom and Englewood high schools. In 1960, the school was changed into a co–educational neighborhood high school.

Athletics
Tilden competes in the Chicago Public League (CPL) and is a member of the Illinois High School Association (IHSA). Tilden sport teams are nicknamed Blue Devils. The boys' basketball team were public league champions three times (1945–46, 1948–49, 1949–50) and regional champions three times (2011–12, 2012–13, 2015–16). The boys' wrestling team placed first in the state in the 1945–46 and 1951–52 seasons and were public league champions thirteen times (1938–39, 1939–40, 1961–69, 1969–70, 1972–73, 1974–75, 1980–81, 1984–85); ranking Class AA three times (1975, 1981 and 1985). The boys' track and field team were Class AA two times (1978–79, 1982–83).

Other Information

Racial Incidents/Gang Violence
On September 28, 1968, A violent clash between black and white students occurred when black students walked out of classes after a school pep rally was cancelled. Black and white members of neighborhood street gangs gathered in front of the school and began fighting; which resulted in a 16–year old white student being shot. On April 25, 1969, a 17–year-old student was shot when a racially motivated brawl erupted involving white and black students at the school. The brawl began in the school's auditorium and continued outside the school building. Eight Chicago police officers were injured and six students were charged with disorderly conduct in the incident. Black students staged a 2–week walkout charging white racism at the school from the April 25th incident until May 8. On November 20, 1992, 15–year-old freshmen student DeLondyn Lawson was shot to death in a gang–related shooting on the school's second floor shortly after 10 a.m. by another student; 16–year-old gang member Joseph White. White wounded two other students in the shooting. Joseph White was sentenced to 45 years in prison.

Notable alumni

Mose Bashaw, (Class of 1906) – American NFL football player.
Johnny "Red" Kerr, (Class of 1950) – American NBA basketball player with the University of Illinois and Syracuse Nationals; later coached the Chicago Bulls and served as a color commentator on the Bulls' television broadcasts
Nick Kladis, (Class of 1949) – basketball player with Loyola University (1949–52) and the Syracuse Nationals, part-owner of baseball's St. Louis Cardinals, member of Chicagoland Sports Hall of Fame
Ralph McGehee, (Class of 1946), Notre Dame football player and Central Intelligence Agency case officer known for his autobiographical indictment of the CIA, Deadly Deceits.
Ralph Metcalfe, (Class of 1930) – sprinter at Marquette University and four-time Olympic medalist; Chicago alderman and four-term U.S. Congressman.
Ed Mieszkowski, (Class of 1941) – American NFL football player.
Johnny Ostrowski, (Class of 1936) – American MLB player (Chicago Cubs, Boston Red Sox, Chicago White Sox, Washington Senators).
Bob Ryland, (Class of 1940) – African American professional tennis player
Mike Swistowicz, (Class of 1945) – American NFL player (New York Yanks).
Chico Walker, (Class of 1977) – American MLB baseball player; (Chicago Cubs), (Boston Red Sox), California Angels and (New York Mets). Walker played on the baseball team which played for the city public league championship at Comiskey Park during the 1974–75 season.

References

External links
School website

Public high schools in Chicago
School buildings completed in 1899
1899 establishments in Illinois
Educational institutions established in 1899